The 2017–18 North Carolina Tar Heels men's basketball team represented the University of North Carolina at Chapel Hill during the 2017–18 NCAA Division I men's basketball season. The team's head coach was Roy Williams, who was in his 15th season as UNC's head men's basketball coach. The Tar Heels played their home games at the Dean Smith Center in Chapel Hill, North Carolina as members of the Atlantic Coast Conference. They finished the season 26–11, 11–7 in ACC play to finish in a four-way tie for fourth place. As the No. 6 seed in the ACC tournament, they defeated Syracuse, Miami, and Duke before losing to Virginia in the championship game. They received an at-large bid to the NCAA tournament as the No. 2 seed in the West region where they defeated Lipscomb before losing to Texas A&M in the Second Round.

Previous season

The Tar Heels finished the 2016–17 season with a record of 33–7, 14–4 in ACC play to finish in first place, winning their 31st ACC regular season title. After beating Miami in the ACC tournament, they lost to Duke in the semifinals. Despite the loss to Duke, the Tar Heels received an at-large bid to the NCAA tournament as a No. 1 seed in the South region. There they defeated No. 16 Texas Southern, No. 8 Arkansas, No. 4 Butler, and No. 2 Kentucky to earn a trip to their 20th Final Four. In a matchup against the Midwest Region's No. 3 seed Oregon in the Final Four, the Tar Heels won 77–76 to advance to the National Championship. In the championship against the West Region's No. 1 seed Gonzaga, the Tar Heels won 71–65, winning the school's sixth national championship.

Offseason

Departures

2017 recruiting class

Incoming transfers

Roster

Schedule and results

|-
!colspan=12 style=|Exhibition

|-
!colspan=12 style=|Non-conference regular season

|-
!colspan=12 style=|ACC Regular Season

|-
!colspan=12 style=|ACC Tournament

|-
!colspan=12 style=| NCAA tournament

Rankings

*AP does not release post-NCAA Tournament rankings

References

North Carolina Tar Heels men's basketball seasons
North Carolina
North Carolina
Tar
Tar